Eric Reed (born ) is an American horse trainer. He is the trainer of Rich Strike, the winner of the 2022 Kentucky Derby.

Early life
Reed's father, trainer Herbert Reed, was 16 years old when Eric was born. His father Herbert trained for over 40 years apprenticing under the guidance of Mack Miller. Eric has trained since 1983.

Career
In 1986, Native Drummer provided Reed his first stakes win in the Forego Stakes at Latonia.  

Reed is the owner of the Mercury Equine Center, a 60-acre thoroughbred training facility in Lexington, Kentucky. In 2016, a fire ravaged the center, killing dozens of horses. Reed believed that a lightning strike was the cause. 

Rich Strike closed at 80-1 odds before the start of the 2022 Derby, the longest odds among all 20 horses. With Rich Strike's win, Reed won his first Kentucky Derby. This win in 2022 makes for the biggest underdog champion since the 1913 Kentucky Derby. With odds of 91–1, winning horse Donerail is the longest odds winner in Kentucky Derby history.

References

American horse trainers

Living people
Year of birth missing (living people)